Life Savers is a 1916 American silent comedy film featuring Oliver Hardy.

Cast
 Oliver Hardy as Plump (as Babe Hardy)
 Billy Ruge as Runt
 Ray Godfrey as Miss Aqua
 Helen Gilmore as Old Maid
 Dad Bates as Neptune

See also
 List of American films of 1916
 Oliver Hardy filmography

External links

1916 films
1916 comedy films
Silent American comedy films
American black-and-white films
1916 short films
American silent short films
American comedy short films
1910s American films